Netley, officially referred to as Netley Abbey, is a village on the south coast of Hampshire, England. It is situated to the south-east of the city of Southampton, and flanked on one side by the ruins of Netley Abbey and on the other by the Royal Victoria Country Park.

Historical development
As late as 1800, Netley consisted of little other than the ruins of the Abbey, and two villas known as Netley Castle and Netley Lodge. Development of the village expanded after the founding of the old Royal Victoria Military Hospital (or Netley Hospital) in 1856, in connection with the Crimean War.  The hospital was used extensively from 1863 through World War II until its closure in 1979 when it was converted into a country park.

Earlier, the abbey ruins made Netley a popular excursion from Southampton - both Cassandra Austen and her sister Jane planning excursions there, for example, when staying in the town in 1808.

Present-day

The oldest part of Netley retains the feel of a somewhat old-fashioned and quaint village, with some traditional small shops, and rows of colourful terraced cottages. It is located along the eastern shore of Southampton Water; the shingle beach looks across to Hythe and Fawley, although the vista is somewhat dominated by Fawley Oil Refinery.

Away from the shore, larger estates of houses have developed over the years which have greatly increased Netley's population and blurred the boundary between Netley Abbey and Butlocks Heath. There were two schools linked to each other, called Netley Abbey Infant School and Netley Abbey & Butlocks Heath County Junior School; there was extensive building on the site of the junior school in the late 1980s, and the site now provides a primary school for the village. There are a handful of churches, including the parish church of St Edward the Confessor.

Netley Railway Station has hourly services to Southampton Central and Portsmouth Harbour via the train company South Western Railway, providing links for commuters both in and out of the village.

See also
List of places of worship in the Borough of Eastleigh
Northam
River Itchen

References

External links

Past Lives and Times of Netley Abbey Village and the Royal Victoria Military Hospital
Information about Netley Military Cemetery and its Residents
Information and history about Netley Royal Victoria Military Hospital

 
Villages in Hampshire
Borough of Eastleigh